Colin Griffin (born 3 August 1982) is an Irish race walker who has competed in the Olympics.

Career
Griffin is a race walker who competed at the 2008 and 2012 Olympic Games in the 50k walk.

Griffin spent a good number of years training in Limerick and Saluzzo, Italy. He coaches fellow Leitrim athlete and Olympian Laura Reynolds who now does MMA. He is director of the Altitude Centre Ireland, a company that specialises in altitude training and simulated altitude equipment.

He returned home from an altitude training camp high in Sierra Nevada in Spain to win Athletics Ireland 10 km walk. It was his first national 10 km track title, winning in a time of 41.47.66 at Morton Stadium, Santry, Dublin.

Griffin was disqualified at the 38 km mark at the 2012 Olympics while he was in contention for a top 16 performance and a personal best time by several minutes. However, that same day Laura Reynolds, who he had coached, finished 20th in the women's 20 km walk in her first Olympic Games.

Notes

References

External links

1982 births
Living people
Irish male racewalkers
Athletes (track and field) at the 2008 Summer Olympics
Athletes (track and field) at the 2012 Summer Olympics
Olympic athletes of Ireland
Sportspeople from County Leitrim
World Athletics Championships athletes for Ireland
AAA Championships winners